The Atari XEGS is the final member of the Atari 8-bit family. Marketed primarily as a video game console, it is compatible with other Atari 8-bit computer software and peripherals and functions as a home computer.

This list contains games released during the XEGS's lifetime, all of which use "Atari XE Video Game Cartridge" packaging. Many are earlier diskette-based releases converted to ROM cartridge. All work with other Atari 8-bit computer models.

Games 
Listed here are all  Atari XEGS games published by Atari Corporation.

See also 
 Lists of video games

Notes

References 

Atari XEGS